The following is a timeline of the history of the city of Marseille, France.

Prior to 17th century

 600 BCE - Massalia founded by Phocaean Greeks (approximate date).
 49 BCE - Siege of Massilia.
 1st C. CE - Roman Catholic diocese of Marseille established.
 ca.290 - Martyrdom of Victor of Marseilles an Egyptian Christian martyr.
 415 - Abbey of St. Victor founded (approximate date).
 470 - Town taken by forces of Visigoth Euric.
 6th C. - Port in operation.
 839 - Town "sacked by Saracens."
 1214
 Town becomes a republic.
 Notre-Dame de la Garde built.
 1252 - Town "taken by Charles of Anjou."
 1262 - Revolt against Angevins.
 1348 - Bubonic plague outbreak.
 1365 - Abbey of St. Victor building constructed.
 1409 - Aix-Marseille University founded.
 1423 -  by the forces of Aragón, led by Alfonso V.
 1453 - Fortifications constructed.
 1481 - Marseille united with Provence.
 1486 - Marseille becomes part of France.
 1524 - Town besieged by forces of Francis I.
 1531 - Château d'If built.
 1542 - Église Saint-Ferréol les Augustins (church) dedicated.
 1593 - Hotel Dieu (hospital) founded.
 1599 -  founded.

17th-18th centuries
 1619 - Église Saint-Cannat (church) dedicated.
 1640 - Maison du Refuge established.
 1649 - Plague.
 1660 - Fort Saint-Jean built.
 1672 - Café in business.
 1673 -  built.
 1685 - The Opéra de Marseille is inaugurated.
 1702 - Marseille Observatory built.
 1720-21 - Great Plague of Marseille.
 1726 - Academy of Science established.
 1749 - Almshouse built.
 1770 - City directory published.
 1778
 Chateau Borely built.
  erected.
 1781 -  created.
 1787 - Grand-Théâtre opens.
 1789 - April: "Revolutionary commotions" occur.
 1790
 Marseille becomes part of the Bouches-du-Rhône souveraineté.
 Jacobin Club founded.
 1793 - August: "Marseilles opposes the revolutionary government, and is reduced."
 1796 - Public library founded.

19th century

1800s–1840s
 1800 - Population: 96,413.
 1801
 Canton of Marseille-1, 2, 3, 4, 5, and 6 created.
 Musée des beaux-arts de Marseille founded.
 1802 -  (school) and Jardin botanique E.M. Heckel (garden) established.
 1803
  begins.
 Cabinet of Natural History founded.
 1808 - 26 February: Birth of Honoré Daumier.
 1810 - Société de médecine de Marseille established.
 1811 - Obelisk erected in the Place Castellane.
 1819 - Muséum d'histoire naturelle de Marseille founded.
 1820 - Population: 101,217.
 1827
  newspaper begins publication.
 Société de statistique de Marseille established.
 1836 - Population: 148,597.
 1837 - Porte d'Aix (arch) inaugurated.
 1846 - Journal de Marseille newspaper begins publication.
 1848
 Paris–Marseille railway begins operating.
 Gare de Marseille-Saint-Charles opens.
 1849 - Canal de Marseille opens (97 miles long).

1850s-1890s

 1851
 Messageries Maritimes shipping company in business.
 Population: 195,258.
 1852 -  built on Boulevard Chave.
 1853 - La Joliette dock constructed.
 1854 -  (zoo) opens.
 1855 - Phare de Sainte Marie built.
 1856
 Population: 233,817.
 Cimetière Saint-Pierre established.
 1857 -  theatre opens.
 1858
 Marseille–Ventimiglia railway begins initial operation.
 Palais du Pharo built.
 1860
 Exchange built.
 Race track in business.
 1862 - Marseille Courthouse built.
 1863 -  built.
 1864
  opens.
 Notre-Dame de la Garde rebuilt.
 1865 - Société Marseillaise de Crédit (bank) and Priory of St. Madeleine founded.
 1866 - Population: 300,131.
 1868 - Le Petit Marseillais newspaper begins publication.
 1869 - Palais Longchamp completed.
 1872 - Business school established.
 1876
 Le Petit Provençal newspaper begins publication.
 Horse-drawn tram begins operating.
 1877 - Société de géographie de Marseille established.
 1878 -  consecrated.
 1881
 Italian-French ethnic unrest.
 Population: 360,099.
 1883 - Marseille coat of arms design adopted.
 1884 - .
 1885 - Soleil du Midi newspaper begins publication.
 1891 -  (school) founded.
 1892 - Funicular of the Notre-Dame de la Garde church begins operating.
 1893
 Marseille Cathedral consecrated.
 Institut Colonial de Marseille founded.
 1894 - Monument des Mobiles erected.(fr)
 1897 -  (hiking club) formed.
 1899
 Olympique de Marseille soccer team formed.
 2500th anniversary of founding of Marseille.

20th century

1900s-1940s

 1901
 "Dock strike."
 Population: 491,161.
 1902 - "Strike of sailors."
 1903
 July: 1903 Tour de France cycling race passes through Marseille.
 September: Bubonic plague outbreak.
 1906
  held.
 Population: 517,498.
 1909
 "Tigeress escapes; terrorises the town."
  founded.
 1911 - Population: 550,619.
 1913 - Fountain installed in the Place Castellane.
 1916 - Musée Cantini founded.
 1917 -  restaurant in business.
 1919 - 13 November: Grand Théâtre burns down.(fr)
 1922
 Marseille Provence Airport opens.
 Colonial exhibition held.
 1923 -  erected.
 1924 - Opera House built.
 1926 - Musée Grobet-Labadié opens.
 1927 -  erected.
 1931 - Population: 800,881.
 1933 - Film Studios Pagnol established.
 1934 - October 9: King Alexander I of Yugoslavia and Louis Barthou assassinated by Bulgarian terrorist Velicko Kerin.
 1936 - Population: 914,232.
 1937 - Stade Vélodrome opens.
 1938
 21 September: .
 28 October: .
 1939 - Baumettes Prison built.
 1940 - Bombing by German and Italian forces.
 1941 - Combat (French Resistance) active.
 1942 - November: German occupation begins.
 1943 - Old Port area evacuated and demolished.
 1944
 Bombing by Allied forces.
 August: Battle of Marseille; German occupation ends.
 La Marseillaise newspaper in publication.
 Gaston Defferre becomes mayor.
 1946
 Arrondissements of Marseille created.
 Jean Cristofol becomes mayor.
 Population: 636,264.
 1947
 November: Labor unrest.
 Michel Carlini becomes mayor.

1950s-1990s

 1952 - Cité radieuse housing complex built.
 1953
 Gaston Defferre becomes mayor again (remains in office until 1986).
 La Tourette housing complex built.
 1955 -  vendetta killings of the criminal  occur.
 1958 - Marseille twinned with Abidjan, Côte d'Ivoire; Antwerp, Belgium; Copenhagen, Denmark;  Genoa, Italy; Haifa, Israel; and Hamburg, Germany.
 1960s - La Castellane neighborhood built.
 1961 - Marseille twinned with Kobe, Japan.
 1962
 A50 autoroute opens.
 Or Thora Synagogue established.
 Population: 778,071.
 1965 - March:  held.
 1967 -  opens.
 1968
 A7 autoroute opens.
 Marseille twinned with Dakar, Senegal.
 Population: 889,029.
 1970 - University of Provence established.
 1972
 A55 autoroute opens.
 Ballet National de Marseille founded.
 Marseille twinned with Odessa, Ukraine.
 1973 - 14 December: Algerian consulate bombed.
 1975
 Er Rahmaniyyà group formed.
 Population: 908,600.
 1977
 Marseille Metro Line 1 begins operating.
 CMA CGM shipping company established.
 1979 - Marseille-Cassis Classique Internationale footrace begins.
 1981 - Rodéo (riot).
 1982
  effected.
 Marseille becomes part of the Provence-Alpes-Côte d'Azur region.
 1983
 SNCF TGV Sud-Est train begins operating.
 Marseille History Museum opens.
 1984
  begins operating.
 Marseille twinned with Piraeus, Greece.
 1986
 March:  held.
 Robert Vigouroux becomes mayor.
 1987
 Jardin de la Magalone becomes property of the city.
 Marseille twinned with Shanghai, China.
 1989 - Marseille Festival of Documentary Film begins.
 1991 - La Commanderie opens.
 1993 -  opens.
 1995
 June:  held.
 Jean-Claude Gaudin becomes mayor.
 Centre de Recherche et de Documentation sur l'Océanie founded.
 Musée de la Faïence de Marseille opens.
 1997 - La Provence newspaper in publication.
 1999 - Population: 795,518.

21st century

2000s
 2001
 Parc du 26e Centenaire inaugurated.
  moves to the former .
 2004 - Marseille twinned with Marrakech, Morocco.
 2006
 École centrale de Marseille created.
 Marseille twinned with Glasgow, UK.
 2007
 Marseille tramway begins operating.
 Labor strike.
 Construction of the International Thermonuclear Experimental Reactor begins in Cadarache, in vicinity of Marseille.
 2008 - Population: 851,420.
 2009 - Collège Ibn Khaldoun opens.

2010s
 2010
 March:  held.
 Garbage strike occurs.
 2011
 Population: 850,636.
 2012 -  pedestrianized.
 2013
 Museum of European and Mediterranean Civilisations opens.
 City designated a European Capital of Culture.
 2014 - March:  held.
 2015
 9 February: Shooting occurs in La Castellane.
 September: Drug ring trial begins.
 December: 2015 Provence-Alpes-Côte d'Azur regional election held.
  begins operating.
 Cantons , 2, 3, 4, 5, 6, 7, 8, 9, 10, 11, and  created per .
 2016 - Metropolis of Aix-Marseille-Provence established.
 2017 - Stabbing occurs in Saint Charles train station.
 2018 - Two buildings collapse in the center of Marseille eight people are killed.

See also
 History of Marseille
 
 
 
 
 History of Provence region
  region

Other cities in the Provence-Alpes-Côte d'Azur region:
 Timeline of Aix-en-Provence
 
 Timeline of Avignon
 Timeline of Nice
 Timeline of Toulon

References

This article incorporates information from the French Wikipedia.

Bibliography

in English
Published in the 19th century
  
 
 
 
 
 
 
 
 
 
 

Published in the 20th century
 
 
 
 
 
 
 
 
 
 
 

Published in the 21st century

in French
 
 
 
 
 
 
  1853-1980 
 1891 ed.
 
  1864-1869
 
 
 
 
 
 
 
 
 
 . Histoire de Marseille. Paris, Robert Laffont, 1978
 . Histoire de Marseille. Toulouse, 1990
  1990–1991. 4 vols.
  (map)

External links

 Map of Marseille, 1993
 Map of Marseille, 1999
 Items related to Marseille, various dates  (via Europeana).
 Items related to Marseille, various dates (via Digital Public Library of America).

Years in France

Marseille
Marseille-related lists